Francis Augustin Bazire (17 April 1939 – 16 January 2022) was a French cyclist. He won a silver medal in the amateur road race at the 1963 UCI Road World Championships. Next year he competed at the 1964 Summer Olympics and finished in 53rd place in the same event.

References

1939 births
2022 deaths
French male cyclists
Cyclists at the 1964 Summer Olympics
Olympic cyclists of France
Sportspeople from Seine-Maritime
Cyclists from Normandy